Georgios Koutroumpis (born 10 February 1991) is a Greek professional footballer who plays as a centre-back for Turkish TFF 1. Lig club Bandırmaspor.

Club career
Born in Athens, Koutroumpis started his professional career in the Football League playing for Kallithea. On 9 August 2012, with a personal interference from ex AEK Athens president and major shareholder Dimitris Melissanidis, signed a four years' contract with AEK Athens for an undisclosed fee. After AEK Athens' relegation, Koutroumpis due to his club financial problems, asked for his contract to be solved, trying to sign with rivals Panathinaikos.

Panathinaikos
Koutroumpis could not be officially announced by Panathinaikos, because he still had a contract with AEK Athens. On June 26, 2013, he participated in Panathinaikos first training session for the 2013-14 season. On July 2, 2013, he filed an appeal against AEK Athens, in order to get whatever the team owed to him. On the same day, he travelled to the Netherlands and Osterberg, in order to take part in Panathinaikos' summer preparation. On 17 July 2013, it was officially announced that Koutroubis had signed a four-years contract with Panathinaikos.

In summer 2016, Adanaspor are monitoring the case of Panathinaikos' 25-year-old central defender Koutroumpis, whose current contract expires at summer of 2017. On 6 October 2016, negotiations started for the extension of his contract. Koutroumpis is among the players Panathinaikos wish to tie up at the club as the two parties has begun negotiations over a new deal and the Greens are willing to offer an improved salary to the 25-year-old central defender, whose current contract expires at the end of 2016–2017 season, in order to keep him in their squad. Italian manager of Panathinaikos Andrea Stramaccioni will handle personally the case of Giorgos Koutroubis' contract extension until the summer of 2019. Eventually, on 15 October 2016, the current contract of 25-year-old player that expired at summer of 2017, will be extended until that of 2019, with better financial terms (€250,000 per year) and a buy-out clause of €1,6 million.

On 21 October 2016, the directors of Trabzonspor are monitoring the case of Panathinaikos' defender, despite the fact that the new contract with the Greens expires at summer of 2019. On 10 September 2017, Marinos Ouzounidis named the international defender as the new captain of the club for the 2017-18 season. On 15 December 2017, the administration of Panathinaikos announced to Koutroumpis that he will be released from the financially struggling Greens in January 2018. The 26-year-old international central defender joined the historic Athens club from AEK back in the summer of 2013 and his current contract with experienced manager Marinos Ouzounidis' team expires in June 2019.

Standard Liège
On 31 January 2018, Koutroumpis signed as a free agent, a six months contract (with an option for an additional year) with Belgian club Standard Liège for an undisclosed fee. On 11 February 2018, he made his debut with the club as a starter in an anxious 4–3 win against Royal Excel Mouscron.

On 17 March 2018, he played as Standard Liège beat Genk 1–0 in extra time to win the 2018 Belgian Cup Final and qualify for the UEFA Europa League. At the end of the season he mutually solved his contract with the club.

Concordia Chiajna
On 12 February 2019, Koutroumpis signed a 6-month contract with Romanian club CS Concordia Chiajna.

OFI
On 30 August 2019, Koutroumpis signed a 2-years contract with Superleague club OFI.
At the end of the season, he mutually solved his contract wth the club.

Újpest
On 24 September 2020, Koutroumpis signed a year contract with NB I club Újpest. On 3 May 2021, he played as a starter as his club beat MOL Vidi FC 1–0 to win the Magyar Kupa and qualify for the UEFA Europa Conference League.

Career statistics

(* Includes UEFA Europa League and UEFA Champions League)
(** Includes SuperLeague Playoffs )

Honours
Panathinaikos
 Greek Cup: 2014

Standard Liège
 Belgian Cup: 2018

Újpest
 Magyar Kupa: 2021

References

External links

Onsports.gr Profile

1991 births
Footballers from Athens
Living people
Greek footballers
Greece youth international footballers
Association football defenders
Kallithea F.C. players
AEK Athens F.C. players
Panathinaikos F.C. players
Standard Liège players
CS Concordia Chiajna players
OFI Crete F.C. players
Újpest FC players
Bandırmaspor footballers
Super League Greece players
Football League (Greece) players
Belgian Pro League players
Liga I players
Nemzeti Bajnokság I players
TFF First League players
Greek expatriate footballers
Greek expatriate sportspeople in Belgium
Expatriate footballers in Belgium
Greek expatriate sportspeople in Romania
Expatriate footballers in Romania
Greek expatriate sportspeople in Hungary
Expatriate footballers in Hungary
Greek expatriate sportspeople in Turkey
Expatriate footballers in Turkey